Bradley "Brad" Harris Johns (born March 5) is a Canadian politician, who was elected to the Nova Scotia House of Assembly in the 2017 provincial election. A member of the Progressive Conservative Association of Nova Scotia, he represents the electoral district of Sackville-Uniacke.

Early life and education
Johns graduated from Sackville High School in 1988 and then attended Mount Saint Vincent University, graduating with a Bachelor of Arts in History.

Before politics
Prior to his election to the House of Assembly, Johns was a Halifax Regional Municipal Councillor from 2000 until his defeat in 2016. Johns was also the first elected representative to serve as a chairperson for the RCMP / HRP Board of Police Commissioners and was deputy mayor of the Halifax Regional Municipality in 2010 and 2011.

In November 2017, Johns endorsed Nova Scotia PC leadership candidate Tim Houston.

On August 31, 2021, Johns was made Minister of Justice and Attorney General as well as Provincial Secretary and Minister of Labor Relations.

Electoral record

References

Year of birth missing (living people)
Halifax Regional Municipality councillors
Living people
Mount Saint Vincent University alumni
Progressive Conservative Association of Nova Scotia MLAs
Attorneys General of Nova Scotia
Members of the Executive Council of Nova Scotia
21st-century Canadian politicians